This is a list of cricketers who have represented Lahore Qalandars in the Pakistan Super League (PSL) since the first season of the PSL in 2016. Players are listed alphabetically using the standard naming format of their country of origin followed by the year(s) that they have been active as a Lahore player.

For a list of current players see the current squad.

A
 Aamer Yamin (2017-2018)
 Kyle Abbott (2018)
 Adnan Rasool (2016)
 Agha Salman (2018-2020)
 Azhar Ali (2016-2017)
 Abdullah Shafique (2022-present)

B
 Bilal Asif (2018-2019)
 Bilawal Bhatti (2017-2018)
 Dwayne Bravo (2016)
 Brendon McCullum (2017-2018)

C
 Kevon Cooper (2016)

D
 Cameron Delport (2016-2018)
 Anton Devcich (2017-2018)

E
 Ehsan Adil (2016)
 Grant Elliott (2017)

F
 Fakhar Zaman (2017-present)
 James Franklin (2017)

G
 Chris Gayle (2016)
 Chris Green (2016-2017)
 Gulraiz Sadaf (2018)

H
 Hammad Azam (2016)
 Harry Brook (2022-present)

I
 Imran Butt (2016)
 Imran Khan (2018)
 Mohammad Irfan (2017)

L
 Chris Lynn (2018)

M
 Angelo Mathews (2018-present)
 Ajantha Mendis (2016)
 Mitchell McClenaghan (2018-present)
 Mirza Tahir Baig (2023-present)
 Ghulam Mudassar (2017-2018)
 Mukhtar Ahmed (2016)
 Mustafizur Rahman (2016, 2018-present)

N
 Sunil Narine (2017-present)
 Naved Yasin (2016)

R
 Denesh Ramdin (2018-present)
 Raza Hasan (2018-present)
 Mohammad Rizwan (2016-2017)
 Jason Roy (2017)

S
 Saif Badar (2017)
 Shaheen Afridi (2018-present)
 Sohaib Maqsood (2016)
 Sohail Akhtar (2018-present)
 Sohail Khan (2018-present)
 Sohail Tanvir (2017)
 Salman Irshad (2018-2020)
 Shai Hope (2023-present)
 Sikandar Raza (2023-present)
 Shane Dadswell (2023-present)

U
 Umar Akmal (2016-present)
 Usman Qadir (2017)

Y
 Yasir Shah (2016-present)

Z
 Zafar Gohar (2016-2017)
 Zia-ul-Haq (2016)
 Zohaib Khan (2016)
 Zaman Khan (2022-present)

References

Lahore
Lahore Qalandars